The 2020 Virginia Cavaliers football team represented the University of Virginia during the 2020 NCAA Division I FBS football season. The Cavaliers were led by fifth-year head coach Bronco Mendenhall and played their home games at Scott Stadium. The team competed as members of the Atlantic Coast Conference (ACC).

After completing their regular season with an overall 5–5 record (4–5 in ACC play), the program announced on December 13 that it would not participate in any bowl game.

Schedule
Virginia had games scheduled against Georgia, Old Dominion, UConn, VMI, and Florida State, which were all canceled due to the COVID-19 pandemic.

The ACC released their schedule on July 29, with specific dates selected at a later date.

Rankings

References

Virginia
Virginia Cavaliers football seasons
Virginia Cavaliers football